Opladen station is in the suburb of Opladen of the city of Leverkusen in the German state of North Rhine-Westphalia. It is on the Gruiten–Köln-Deutz railway, which was opened on 25 September 1867 from Ohligs by the Bergisch-Märkische Railway Company (BME). It was extended to Mülheim BME station on 8 April 1868. The station was also opened on 25 August 1867. The original station building was demolished in 1965 and replaced by a building built in 1968. This building has been demolished in 2016. It is classified by Deutsche Bahn as a category 4 station.

The station is served hourly by Regional-Express line RE 7 Rhein-Münsterland-Express between Krefeld and Münster via Cologne and Hamm. It is also served every 30 minutes between 5am to 8pm by Regionalbahn  RB 48 Rhein-Wupper-Bahn, stopping at all stations between Wuppertal-Oberbarmen and Cologne, continuing every hour to Bonn-Mehlem.

It is served by seven bus routes, operated by Kraftverkehr Wupper-Sieg: 201 (at 20 minute intervals), 202 (20), 203 (60), 222 (20), 223 (60), 231 (20) and 239 (20). It is also served by two routes operated by Wiedenhoff: 250 (60) and 255 (20) and by two routes operated by Hüttebräucker: 251 (5 trips) and 253 (at 30 minute intervals).

Notes

Railway stations in North Rhine-Westphalia
Railway stations in Germany opened in 1867
1867 establishments in Prussia
Buildings and structures in Leverkusen